Víctor Serrano (born 20 September 1949) is a Puerto Rican long-distance runner. He competed in the marathon at the 1976 Summer Olympics.

References

1949 births
Living people
Athletes (track and field) at the 1976 Summer Olympics
Puerto Rican male long-distance runners
Puerto Rican male marathon runners
Olympic track and field athletes of Puerto Rico
Place of birth missing (living people)